Molesworth is a town in the upper Goulburn Valley region of Victoria, Australia.

Molesworth Post Office was opened on 1 January 1875 and was closed on 30 June 1994. The railway arrived in 1890 and the station was closed in 1978.

Facilities in the town include a caravan park/camp ground, general store and public hall.

References

Towns in Victoria (Australia)
Shire of Murrindindi